Ion Ceban (born 30 June 1980) is a Moldovan politician and the current mayor of Chișinău, the capital of Moldova. Ceban was Vice President of the Moldovan parliament in 2019, and has served as a member of parliament in 3 legislatures. He was formerly leader of the faction of the Party of Socialists in the Chișinău Municipal Council from 2015 to 2019. He has held different positions at the governmental level starting from the head of a department to Deputy Minister. Ceban was a member of the Communist Party of Moldova from 2004 to 2012, when the party, then headed by Vladimir Voronin governed.

Early life and education
Ceban was born on June 30, 1980 in Chișinău. His parents are Vasile and Eugenia Ceban, a municipal counselor from the SPRM. In 2019, Ceban received a Doctoral Degree Studies in Public Administration at RANEPA in Russia.

 1997–2002, State University of Moldova, Faculty of Mathematics and Computer Science, with university degree/diploma.
 2002–2003, Technical University of Moldova, Faculty of Computers, Informatics and Microelectronics, master's degree diploma.
 2015–2018, Academy of Public Administration of the President of Russian Federation, Speciality State and Municipal Administration, Moscow, Russia.
 2016, 2018, National School of Administration of the Prime Minister of the French Republic, internship, Paris, France.
 2018 – present, Administration School of Berlin, Germany.

Career

Professional activity
From 2000 to 2002 Ceban worked within SAGD, where he was in charge of the development and for the projects and programs coordination for the social field, at the Chisinau Mayoralty. From 2002 to 2004 he was the director of the projects department within Government Information Network. In 2004–05, the senior consultant for the internal policy field within the President Office of the Republic of Moldova. In 2005–2008, he was the head of the Youth Programs Department and the Deputy Minister of Education and Youth. Then, he was employed within the Government of the Republic of Moldova, as the head of the secretariat of the national committee for European Integration. From 2009 to 2011 he was the consultant, head of the cabinet of the Deputy Chairman of the Parliament.

Political activity 
Ceban became an MP within the lists of PCRM and following the snap parliamentary elections held on November 28, 2010  and worked within the Committee for culture, education, research, youth, sport and mass media. In September 2012, he announced within a press conference, that he left PCRM to join a new political project launched with couple of months before by his former colleagues Igor Dodon and Zinaida Greceanîi, PSRM.  At that time, he denied that he was blackmailed to leave the PCRM. In a short period of time, he became the secretary responsible for the ideology of the PSRM. Following the elections of November 2014, he became an MP within the PSRM lists.

In 2015–2019, he was the chairperson of the PSRM fraction at the Municipal Council. In June 2015, he resigned from the MP mandate, in a short time after he became within the PSRM lists, the municipal counsellor in Chișinău.

In 2016–2018, he held the positions as the Counsellor of the President for the internal policy, secretary, press secretary of the President of the Republic of Moldova, but he kept also the position of the municipal counsellor. In 2018, he left the President Office, when he was the candidate for the position of Mayor of the Chisinau muni. He remained the leader of the PSRM fraction within the Council of the Chisinau muni. The President Office has requested the National Integrity Authority to establish if the position of the Counsellor of the President is or not in compliance with the position of the Municipal Counsellor. At this request, the institution answered that according to the Law on the personnel statute within the office of the persons with public dignity position, the President Counsellor cannot held any other public positions or contractual positions within public authorities. Ion Ceban resigned from the position of the President Counsellor and employed as the President’s secretary, and has carried out the position of the press secretary.

After the parliamentary elections held on February 24, 2019, he was elected as MP within the PSRM lists. Since June 8, 2019, he has held one of those 4 positions of the Deputy Chairman of the Parliament of the Republic of Moldova.

2018 Chișinău mayoral election 
On May 20, 2018, in the first round of the elections, Ceban received 40.97% of the vote. On June the 3rd, the second round of elections was carried out, where Ion Ceban and Andrei Năstase participated, the candidates have got the highest number of votes in the first round of elections. The presence at elections was over 39,10%. Andrei Năstase, the candidate of the “Dignity and Truth Platform” has got 52,57% of votes, he was elected at the position of the general Mayor of the Chisinau municipality.

On June 19, 2018, by the Ruling of the Central Office of the Chișinău Court, due to the violations committed by both candidates, and particularly was stated that both candidates have made electoral campaigning within the day of the election which is against the provisions of the electoral Code, the legality of the new local elections of May 20, 2018 (I round) – of June 3, 2018 (II round) for the position of the Mayor of the Chisinau muni was not confirmed.

2019 Chișinău mayoral election 

On September 2, 2019, he was registered as electoral candidate for the elections of October 20, for the position of the Mayor of Chișinău from the PSRM side. The electoral rival Valeriu Munteanu, the leader of the party Save Bessarabia Union (Uniunea Salvati Basarabia) has requested from the CEC to exclude Ion Ceban from the elections because of undeclared funds use.
Valeriu Munteanu has referred to the expenditures weekly reported by the PSRM which are much lower than the actual expenditures, "Whether the PSRM has already been connected to the flow of money that would come from the government activity, and if these things have not yet started, it means that the funding continue to come from Moscow and thus, the money come from the Kremlin, by using the sideways.” 

On October 7, 2019, he filed a lawsuit against the candidate Ion Ceban, in connection with the violation of the electoral legislation by the Socialists, by using the electoral materials on which the image of the historical personality is printed - the ruler Ștefan cel Mare and Holy. On October 10, 2019 the Chișinău court, the headquarter of Râșcani, found that Ion Ceban violated the electoral law by using the image of a historical personality to make electoral campaigning, forcing him to remove all the road-electoral boards that used the Ștefan cel Mare's image and to liquidate the undistributed stock of the electoral newspaper, on which the image of the ruler was printed, and from the online environment also.
On October 15, 2019, the Court of Appeal of Chișinău has declared the cassation of the decision of the first court, and a new decision as a conclusion was adopted according to which the action filed by Valeriu Munteanu against Ion Ceban and the Socialist Party of the Republic of Moldova was declared inadmissible, decision upheld by the Supreme Court of Justice.

On October 20, 2019 the first round of the local elections was carried out. Ion Ceban got 40,16% of the voters, and his electoral rival Andrei Nastase, was supported by 30,09% of voters.

On October 21, 2019, Ion Ceban proposed to the ACUM Block (DT and PAS) to build the coalition within the Municipal Council, which would allow a stable majority to be achieved in the deliberative fore of the Capital. He expressed the readiness, if he reaches the mayor position, to assign to the potential coalition partners two functions of deputy mayor, the leadership of the Municipal Council, as well as two functions of praetors.

In December 2021, Ceban launched a new political party: the National Alternative Movement.

Personal life 
Ceban is married to Tatiana Țaulean. He has two children: Ilinca and Vasile. According to his CV he speaks the Romanian, Russian, English, and French languages.

Alleged attack 
Ceban stated that in the Spring of 2019, he was attacked when he was out walking with his wife and children. He stated that someone aimed a firearm in the direction of him and his family and that "The bullet passed between me and my wife, while holding the children by the hands."

Controversies 
On 31 August 2021, Romanian Language Day otherwise known as Limba noastră in Moldova, Ceban posted on his Facebook with the words Limba Română (which is in contradiction with the Moldovenist position of the Party of Socialists of the Republic of Moldova).

References 

Living people
1980 births
Moldovan politicians
Government ministers of Moldova
Moldovan MPs 2010–2014
Party of Communists of the Republic of Moldova politicians
Party of Socialists of the Republic of Moldova politicians
Mayors of Chișinău